Warlock 5 is a comic book that was written by Gordon Derry and Denis Beauvais and published by Aircel Comics. Volume 1 lasted for 22 issues, published from 1986 to 1989. Volume 2 lasted for 7 issues, all published in 1989.

Plot
Warlock 5 is a comic book in which five beings engage in a fight for the thing of ultimate importance.

Reception
Martin A. Stever reviewed Warlock 5 in Space Gamer/Fantasy Gamer No. 83. Stever commented that "the lure of this book is that the reader is unsure of exactly what is going on. Lots of magic, guns, swords, robots, babes, motorcycles, and very nice art".

References

1986 comics debuts
1989 comics endings
Aircel Comics titles
Canadian comics titles